Jeff Bonds (born May 14, 1982 in Los Angeles, California, U.S.) is an American professional basketball player, currently plays in the LEB Gold, for the Lobe Huesca.  He previously played for Bàsquet Muro and Viopisa Gijón at the Silver level of the Liga Española de Baloncesto, in the British Basketball League for the Birmingham Bullets and the Sheffield Sharks and later in Bàsquet Mallorca in LEB Gold.

Nicknamed "Premium", the 6'-7" Forward attended the California State Polytechnic University, Pomona from 2001 to 2005, where he was named as an NABC All-American in the 2004–2005 season,  before signing professionally with Birmingham Bullets in 2005. During his debut season in British basketball, Bonds averaged 17.09 points-per-game and 6.79 rebounds-per-game. Following the demise and closure of the Bullets franchise in 2006, Bonds moved north to sign for the Sharks.

He was named as the BBL Player of the Month for January 2007 and later that season went on to win the BBL Co-MVP with Guilford Heat star Brian Dux.

References

External links
FEB.es profile

1982 births
Living people
American expatriate basketball people in Spain
American expatriate basketball people in the United Kingdom
Basketball players from Los Angeles
Birmingham Bullets players
British Basketball League players
Cal Poly Pomona Broncos men's basketball players
Sheffield Sharks players
Small forwards
Gijón Baloncesto players
CB Peñas Huesca players
Bàsquet Mallorca players
American men's basketball players